Shelina Laura Zadorsky (born October 24, 1992) is a Canadian professional soccer player who plays as a centre-back for FA Women's Super League club Tottenham Hotspur and the Canada national team. She previously played for Australian W-League club Perth Glory and Swedish top-division club Vittsjö GIK. Zadorsky won a bronze medal with Canada at the 2016 Rio Olympics and won a gold medal with Canada at the 2020 Tokyo Olympics.

Club career

Ottawa Fury FC
Zadorsky played for USL W-League side Ottawa Fury Women, helping captain them go to a second-place finish in the 2013 Central Conference final and a win in 2014. The Fury disbanded its long-standing women's program in March 2015 for "business reasons".

Perth Glory
Zadorsky was signed by Australian side Perth Glory on August 1, 2014,  ahead the 2014 W-League season.  Zadorsky played 14 games for the Glory, scoring one goal and  helping them reach the regular season win and a Grand Final appearance.

Vittsjö GIK
Following the folding of the Fury,  Zadorsky signed with Damallsvenskan side Vittsjö GIK, in the top flight of Swedish football, on March 29, 2015.  She appeared 18 times for side during the 2015 season.

Washington Spirit
On February 8, 2016, it was announced that Zadorsky would play for the Washington Spirit for the 2016 season of the National Women's Soccer League via the NWSL Player Allocation She played 11 regular season matches, starting 10, totaling 911 minutes in the regular season, as well as played the entire match for both post season matches. Zadorsky recorded assist in the semifinal to Ali Krieger to give the Spirit the early lead on the way to the team's first ever semifinal victory. Zadorsky was voted Spirit Newcomer of the Year for 2016.

She played 21 games for the Spirit in 2017, serving as the side's captain.

Orlando Pride
On January 23, 2018, Zadorsky was traded to the Orlando Pride in exchange for Aubrey Bledsoe and a first round draft pick. Zadorsky played in 23 games during her first season with the Pride.  She was reassigned as a federation player to the Pride ahead of the 2019 season. On September 29, 2019, Zadorsky scored her first goal for the club in a 1–1 draw with Sky Blue FC. In March 2020, the impending NWSL season was postponed due to the coronavirus pandemic. An eventual restart was made through a smaller schedule 2020 NWSL Challenge Cup tournament. However, on June 22, Orlando withdrew from the tournament following positive COVID-19 tests among both players and staff.

Tottenham Hotspur
In August 2020, due to Orlando Pride withdrawing from the Challenge Cup due to COVID-19, Zadorsky moved to English FA WSL club Tottenham Hotspur on loan ahead of the 2020–21 season. The loan was made permanent through the end of the season in January 2021. With Zadorsky's leadership skills and elite play, she was appointed captain during the 2021–22 season.

International career

Youth 
Zadorsky made her debut for Canada's youth teams at the age of 14.  She won a bronze medal at the 2008 CONCACAF Women's U-17 Championship, represented Canada at the 2008 FIFA U-17 Women's World Cup in New Zealand, played for Canada at their fourth-place finish at the 2010 CONCACAF Women's U-20 Championship in Guatemala, won silver at the 2012 CONCACAF Women's U-20 Championship in Panama and represented Canada at the 2012 FIFA U-20 Women's World Cup in Japan.

Senior 
Zadorsky made her full team debut on January 14, 2013, at the age of 20.  While Zadorsky did not make the 2015 Women's World Cup roster, she was in the side that finished fourth at the 2015 Pan American Games in Toronto.  She was on the roster and played on the Canadian side which won the bronze medal at the 2016 Rio Olympics.

On May 25, 2019, she was named to the roster for the 2019 FIFA Women's World Cup.

Career statistics

Club

International goals 

 As of match played February 4, 2020. Canada score listed first, score column indicates score after each Zadorsky goal.

Honours
Perth Glory
 W-League runner-up: 2014
Canada U20
 CONCACAF Women's U-20 Championship runner-up: 2012
Canada
 Summer Olympics: 2021; bronze medal: 2016

References

External links

Washington Spirit player profile

1992 births
Living people
Women's association football defenders
Canadian women's soccer players
Canada women's international soccer players
Canadian expatriate sportspeople in Australia
Canadian people of Czech descent
Damallsvenskan players
Expatriate women's footballers in Sweden
Expatriate women's soccer players in Australia
Footballers at the 2015 Pan American Games
Michigan Wolverines women's soccer players
National Women's Soccer League players
Perth Glory FC (A-League Women) players
Soccer players from London, Ontario
Vittsjö GIK players
Washington Spirit players
Footballers at the 2016 Summer Olympics
Olympic soccer players of Canada
Olympic bronze medalists for Canada
Olympic medalists in football
Medalists at the 2016 Summer Olympics
Orlando Pride players
2019 FIFA Women's World Cup players
Tottenham Hotspur F.C. Women players
Women's Super League players
Canadian expatriate sportspeople in England
Expatriate women's footballers in England
Pan American Games competitors for Canada
Canadian expatriate sportspeople in Sweden
Canadian expatriate women's soccer players
Footballers at the 2020 Summer Olympics
Medalists at the 2020 Summer Olympics
Olympic gold medalists for Canada
Toronto Lady Lynx players
Ottawa Fury (women) players
USL W-League (1995–2015) players